Enquête (lit. "Inquest" or "Inquiry") is a Canadian French-language television newsmagazine series, which airs weekly on Ici Radio-Canada Télé and Ici RDI. The show is anchored by Marie-Maude Denis, and includes contributions from journalists Hélène Courchesne, Josée Dupuis, Sylvie Fournier, Guy Gendron, Normand Grondin, Solveig Miller, Madeleine Roy, Françoise Stanton, Pascale Turbide and Julie Vaillancourt.

Significance
An episode centered on businessman Tony Accurso led to a series of events which resulted in a public inquiry commission on construction of public works.

Programs aired
 PROFUNC

See also
The Fifth Estate, the English-language counterpart produced by CBC News

External links
 Enquête

1990s Canadian television news shows
Ici Radio-Canada Télé original programming
CBC News
2000s Canadian television news shows
2010s Canadian television news shows
2020s Canadian television news shows